Alexei Vladimirovich Chistyakov (born 7 April 1968) is a Russian ice hockey coach and former professional player. He currently serves as head coach of HC Tornado in the Zhenskaya Hockey League (ZhHL).

Chistyakov served as head coach of the Russian national team for the IIHF Women's World Championships in 2017 and 2019, the women's ice hockey tournament at the 2017 Winter Universiade and the women's ice hockey tournament at the 2019 Winter Universiade. He was head coach of the Olympic Athletes from Russia women's national ice hockey team that competed in the women's ice hockey tournament at the 2018 Winter Olympics.

References

External links
 
 

1968 births
Living people
Amur Khabarovsk players
Dizel Penza players
Elemash Elektrostal players
Kristall Elektrostal players
Lokomotiv Yaroslavl players
Neftyanik Almetyevsk players
Russian ice hockey coaches
Russian ice hockey forwards
Severstal Cherepovets players
Sportspeople from Yaroslavl
Titan Klin players
HC Vityaz players
Zhenskaya Hockey League coaches